This is a list of notable discrete-event simulation software.

Commercial

Open Source

Further reading

References 

Simulation software
discrete event simulation software
Events (computing)